Leeds Philosophical and Literary Society is a Learned society in Leeds, West Yorkshire, England.  It was founded in 1819, and its museum collection forms the basis of Leeds City Museum, which reopened in September 2008.  The printed works and papers of the society are held by Leeds University Library. The Society is a registered charity under English law.

Among the early members of the society were John Marshall (President, 1820–26), Benjamin Gott, William Hey (President, 1831–33), and Edward Baines and his son, Sir Edward Baines. Richard Reynolds was an honorary secretary. More recent Presidents include John Le Patourel (1966–68).

Foundation 
Robert Dennis Chantrell won the competition to build the new Hall for the Society in May 1819 in Classical style. The Hall was sited on the corner of Park Row and Bond Street in the Georgian west end of Leeds. The foundation stone was laid by Benjamin Gott on 9 July 1819 and the Hall was opened on 6 April 1821. The Hall had a lecture theatre, library, laboratory and museum. Charles Turner Thackrah gave the opening address, pointing out that the Hall would provide a place for "the conversational diffusion of knowledge". Before the creation of any college or university in Leeds, the Society provided an important opportunity for civic education.

Later history 
The Hall was refaced and extended in 1861-62 by Dobson & Chorley. A new entrance was built on Park Row. In 1876, the inaugural meeting of the Leeds Architectural Association was held in the Hall.

The Hall was badly damaged in an air raid in 1941 when many museum exhibits were lost, but the building was given a new concrete façade and remained as a museum until 1965. The Hall was demolished in 1966. William Gott was a benefactor to the museum, and one of the Society's vice presidents in later life.

In 1925, the Society began publishing two journals: Proceedings of the Leeds Philosophical and Literary Society. Scientific section (which ran from 1925 to 1998, producing twelve volumes) and Proceedings of the Leeds Philosophical and Literary Society. Literary and Historical Section (which ran from 1925 to 1999, producing twenty-five volumes).

The Society celebrated its bicentenary in 2019 and launched a new website in 2021.

List of presidents
The following have been presidents of the society:
 
1820–26: John Marshall  
1826–28: Rev. W. H. Bathurst, M.A.   
1828–31: Michael Thomas Sadler, M.P.   
1831–33: William Hey  
1833–35: James Williamson, M.D.   
1835–37: Rev. Joseph Holmes, M.A.   
1837–40: Rev. Richard Winter Hamilton   
1840–42: Adam Hunter, M.D.   
1842–45: John Hope Shaw   
1845–50: Rev. William Sinclair, M.A.   
1850–51: William West, F.R.S.   
1851–54: Rev. Charles Wicksteed, B.D.   
1854–57: John Hope Shaw
1857–58: James Garth Marshall, F.G.S.   
1858–59: Rev. W. F. Hook, D.D.   
1859–61: Rev. Alfred Barry, M.A.   
1861–63: Thomas Pridgin Teale, F.R.S.   
1863–66: Rev. Thomas Hincks, B.A.   
1866–68: Charles Chadwick, M.D.   
1868–72: John Deakin Heaton, M.D.   
1872–74: Rev. Canon Woodford, D.D.   
1874–76: J. I. Ikin, F.R.C.S.   
1876–78: Rev. J. H. McCheane, M.A.   
1878–81: T. Clifford Allbutt, M.D., F.R.S.   
1881–83: Rev. John Gott, D.D.   
1883–85: J. E. Eddison, M.D.   
1885–86: Edward Atkinson, F.L.S.   
1886–89: Thomas Marshall, M.A.   
1889–92: Thomas Pridgin Teale, M.A., F.R.S.   
1892–94: Rev. J. H. D. Matthews, M.A.   
1894–96: Rev. Charles Hargrove, M.A.   
1896–98: Edmund Wilson, F.S.A.   
1898–1900: Nathan Bodington, M.A., Litt.D.   
1900–02: J. H. Wicksteed, President Inst.M.E.   
1902–04: Arthur Smithells, B.Sc., F.R.S.   
1904–06: J. E. Eddison, M.D.   
1906–09: E. Kitson Clark, M.A., F.S.A., M.Inst.C.E.   
1909–11: Rev. J. R. Wynne-Edwards, M.A.   
1911–12: C. T. Whitmell, M.A., B.Sc., F.R.A.S.   
1912–14: P. F. Kendall, M.Sc., F.G.S.   
1914–17: Rev. W. H. Draper, M.A.   
1917–19: James E. Bedford, F.G.S.   
1919–22: Sydney D. Kitson, M.A., F.S.A., F.R.I.B.A.   
1922–24: Arthur J. Grant, M.A.   
1924–26: Walter Garstang, M.A., D.Sc., F.Z.S.   
1926–28: Edwin Hawkesworth   
1928–30: Frederick Woodward Branson, F.I.C.   
1930–32: E. O. Dodgson   
1932–34: A. Gilligan, D.Sc., F.G.S.   
1934–36: Richard Whiddington, M.A., D.Sc., F.R.S.   
1936–39: Hugh R. Lupton, M.C., M.A.   
1939–46: W. M. Edwards, M.C., M.A.   
1946–48: E. A. Spaul, D.Sc., Ph.D.   
1948–50: W. L. Andrews   
1950–52: J. N. Tetley, D.S.O., LL.D.   
1952–54: Terry Thomas, M.A., LL.D., B.Sc., Ph.D.   
1954–56: H. C. Versey, D.Sc., F.G.S.,   
1956–58: H. S. Vick, J.P.   
1958–60: H. Orton, M.A., B.Litt.   
1960–62: Sir George Martin, LL.D., J.P.   
1962–64: E. J. Wood, M.A.   
1964–66: Reginald Dawson Preston, D.Sc., F.R.S., F.Inst.P.   
1966–68: John Le Patourel, M.A., D.Phil.   
1968–70: G. P. Meredith, M.Sc., M.Ed., Ph.D.   
1970–72: J. G. Wilson, M.A., Ph.D., F.Inst.P.   
1972–74: J. Taylor, M.A.   
1974–76: H. Henson, D.Sc., Ph.D., F.R.E.S.   
1976–78: P. R. J. Burch, M.A., Ph.D.   
1978–81: R. Reed, M.Sc., Ph.D   
1981–83: Lord Marshall of Leeds, M.A., LL.B.   
1983–85: B. R. Hartley, M.A., F.S.A.   
1985–87: Dennis Cox, B.A., A.L.A.   
1987–89: B. Colville, M.B., B.S., F.R.C.G.P.   
1989–91: I. S. Moxon, M.A., B.A.   
1991–93: R. F. M. Byrn, M.A., Ph.D.   
1993–95: Mrs J. E. Mortimer, B.A.   
1995–97: A. C. Chadwick, B.Sc., Ph.D., D.Sc., C.Biol., F.I.Biol., F.R.G.S.   
1997–99: O. S. Pickering, B.A., B.Phil., Ph.D., Dip.Lib.   
1999–2003: P. J. Evennett, B.Sc., Ph.D., Hon. F.R.M.S.
2004–06: M. R. D. Seaward, M.Sc., Ph.D., D.Sc., F.L.S.
2007–09: C. J. Hatton, B.Sc., Ph.D., C.Phys., F.Inst.P.
2010–13: A. C. T. North, B.Sc., Ph.D., C.Phys., F.Inst.P.
2014-16: J. M. Hill B.A., D.Phil., D.Univ., F.E.A., F.R.S.A.
2016–19 : C. J. Hatton, B.Sc., Ph.D., C.Phys., F.Inst.P.
2020–: G. E. Blair, B.Sc., Ph.D., F.R.S.B., F.L.S.

Former curators of the museum (1821–1921)
John Atkinson
Henry Denny
Louis Compton Miall
Henry Crowther

Other notable figures connected to the society

Etheldred Benett – donor
Alexander Crichton – donor
Violet Crowther - curator
William Gott - benefactor and vice president
James Kitson, 1st Baron Airedale and  his  father  James  Kitson, Mayor of Leeds – new  proprietary  member  and  subscriber respectively in 1852–53
Francis Lupton – proprietary  member in 1852–53
William Middleton  and  his  son  John  William  Middleton – subscriber  and new ordinary  member respectively in 1852–53
James Motley – donor
Washington Teasdale – member
John Joseph Willson – member

References

Further reading

External links

Leeds Museums & Galleries: Three Women: a plesiosaurus, a mistaken identity, and a hat.

Organisations based in Leeds
Regional and local learned societies of the United Kingdom
1819 establishments in England
Organizations established in 1819
Leeds Blue Plaques
Charities based in England